Appoquinimink may refer to:

Appoquinimink Hundred, an unincorporated subdivision of New Castle County, Delaware
Appoquinimink River, a river in northern Delaware
Appoquinimink School District, a public school district in New Castle County, Delaware